Sirukadambur is a village in the Sendurai taluk of Ariyalur district, Tamil Nadu, India.

Demographics 

As per the 2011 census, Sirukadambur had a total population of 3225 with 1586 males and 1669 females.

References 

Villages in Ariyalur district